Tristan Boubaya (born 2 October 1989) is a French professional footballer who plays as a midfielder for  club Le Mans.

Career
Boubaya was part of the Nantes academy. He went on to play in the third and fourth tiers for Carquefou, Épinal, Fontenay, Les Herbiers, and Saint-Malo before signing with the reserve team of Lorient in the Championnat National 2 in August 2017. He would eventually be made captain of the reserve team.

Boubaya made his first team debut for Lorient in a 1–0 Coupe de la Ligue win over Valenciennes on 14 August 2018. He played in his only Ligue 2 match with the club on 8 February 2019, a late substitute appearance against Grenoble.

In May 2020, Boubaya signed with Championnat National side Concarneau. In May 2022, he agreed to join Le Mans in the summer.

Personal life
Boubaya was born in France, and is of mixed French and Algerian descent.

References

External links
 
 
 Foot-National Profile

1989 births
Living people
Sportspeople from Côtes-d'Armor
Footballers from Brittany
French footballers
French sportspeople of Algerian descent
Association football midfielders
FC Nantes players
USJA Carquefou players
SAS Épinal players
Vendée Fontenay Foot players
Les Herbiers VF players
US Saint-Malo players
FC Lorient players
US Concarneau players
Le Mans FC players
Ligue 2 players
Championnat National players
Championnat National 2 players